Sila At railway station is a railway station in Uttaradit. It is a Class 1 station.

History
Due to Uttaradit Station being overcrowded, a new station had to be built. Therefore, in 1958, Sila At Station was built about two kilometres north of the original station, in the applied Thai architecture style. Originally, the station's name was "New Uttaradit", but was later changed and became the Northern Line's major railway container yard.

A Hanomag Steam Locomotive, No. 274, is on display on station premises.

Sub-divisions
 Sector 3 Train Traffic Department
 State Railway of Thailand Northern Line Maintenance Department
 Sila At Railway Police Station
 Sila At Branch of State Railway of Thailand Medical Department
 Sector 3 Mechanical and Engineering Department

Train services
 Special Express 3/4 Bangkok-Sawankhalok/Sila At-Bangkok
 Special Express 9/10 Bangkok-Chiang Mai-Bangkok
 Special Express 7/8 Bangkok-Chiang Mai-Bangkok
 Special Express 13/14 Bangkok-Chiang Mai-Bangkok
 Express 51/52 Bangkok-Chiang Mai-Bangkok
 Rapid 105/106 Bangkok-Sila At-Bangkok
 Rapid 107/112 Bangkok-Den Chai-Bangkok
 Rapid 109/102 Bangkok-Chiang Mai-Bangkok
 Rapid 111/108 Bangkok-Den Chai-Bangkok
 Local 407/408 Nakhon Sawan-Chiang Mai-Nakhon Sawan
 Local 403/410 Phitsanulok-Sila At-Phitsanulok

References
 
 
 
 
 

Railway stations in Thailand